Athyma asura, the studded sergeant, is a species of nymphalid butterfly found in tropical and subtropical Asia.

References

  
 
 

Athyma
Fauna of Pakistan
Butterflies of Asia
Butterflies of Singapore
Butterflies of Indochina
Butterflies described in 1858